The 2011 International ZO Women's Tournament was held from November 25 to 27 at the Curling Center Wetzikon in Wetzikon, Switzerland as part of the 2011–12 World Curling Tour. The purse for the event was CHF16,000, and the winner, Andrea Schöpp, received CHF6,000. The event was held in a round-robin format.

Teams

Round robin standings

Playoffs

External links

International ZO women's tournament
International ZO women's tournament
International ZO Women's Tournament
2011 in Swiss women's sport
2011 in women's curling